Bonner County Daily Bee 
The Bonner County Daily Bee (also known as the Daily Bee) is a U.S. daily newspaper based in Sandpoint, Idaho . It is owned by the Hagadone Media Group and is part of the Hagadone News Network.

History

Founding as The Beehive
The Bonner County Daily Bee has been in print since 1965   and its target markets are Bonner and Boundary counties.

The paper was founded as a four-page newspaper by Ernest Gale "Pete" and Adell "Dellie" Thompson after a dispute over an ad account, according to "Beautiful Bonner: The History of Bonner County."

The couple moved from North Dakota to Coeur d'Alene, lured by a job at the "Kootenai County Leader" in 1961. Thompson moved to Sandpoint a short time later where he went to work for the News-Bulletin where he stayed until 1965 when he bought half interest in a local print shop. Thompson would soon buy the entire business to ensure a move to a larger facility and renamed the business, Pend Oreille Printers. [2]

After moving to the new location, the Thompsons launched The Beehive in response to a move by the News-Bulletin for a key ad account held by Thompson's print shop. The couple believed the community needed a daily newspaper to better serve the area. According to "Beautiful Bonner," the couple "came up with the name for the new paper from a comment made by their typesetter, Jeannie Hottel. "Call it the Beehive," she said. "You sure stirred up a hornet's nest." [2]

In 1966, the Beehive and print shop moved to 310 Church St., where the newspaper still resides. Thompson purchased the Sandpoint Bulletin and, for a time, published both the Bee Hive and the News-Bulletin.

Current name adopted
The Beehive was published until 1968  when it was merged with the News-Bulletin and its name changed to the Sandpoint Daily Bee. In 1988, the paper's name was changed to the Bonner County Daily Bee.

Sale
In July 1984, Thompson sold Pend Oreille Printers and the Sandpoint Daily Bee as well as the Bonners Ferry Herald, which he had purchased in 1978, and the Priest River Times, which he had purchased in 1976, to the Hagadone Media Group. [3]

Format
The Bonner County Daily Bee maintains a website, app and social media presence that are updated several times a day with breaking news stories and articles on current events, community news and local sports.

Awards
The paper has won multiple journalism awards, including several general excellence awards from the Idaho Newspaper Association, and the Utah-Idaho-Spokane Associated Press Association as well as many writing and photography awards. [1]

Location
Its main office is in Sandpoint, Idaho.

References

External links
 
 The Hagadone Corporation
 The Hagadone Media Group
 

Newspapers published in Idaho
Sandpoint, Idaho
Daily newspapers published in the United States